Bargainville is a 1993 album by Canadian band Moxy Früvous, their first major-label release. This disc's subject matter is divided between comedy and serious personal, social, and ecological issues.

Bargainville was released on July 19, 1993, in Canada by Warner Music Canada and on February 8, 1994, in the US by WEA/Atlantic Records.

Track listing
"River Valley" – 3:24
"Stuck in the 90's" – 4:26
"B.J. Don't Cry" – 3:19
"Video Bargainville" – 4:15
"Fell in Love" – 4:24
"The Lazy Boy" – 3:14
"My Baby Loves a Bunch of Authors" – 2:33
"The Drinking Song" – 5:07
"Morphée" – 2:13
"King of Spain" – 2:58
"Darlington Darling" – 3:36
"Bittersweet" – 3:25
"Laika" – 2:53
"Spiderman" – 1:44
"Gulf War Song" – 4:02

Personnel
Moxy Früvous
Jian Ghomeshi - lead vocals (2, 4, 6), backing vocals (1, 3, 5, 7-15), snare drum (1, 3-4, 7), tambourine (2, 5-6, 12), sheet metal (7, 10, 12), drums (6, 11), bass drum (2, 10), chicken shakers (6), bomb (8), shakers (10), go-go bells (10), conga (13), wooden door percussion (13)
Murray Foster - lead vocals (12), backing vocals (1-4, 6-8, 10-11, 13-15), bass guitar (2-5, 7, 11, 13), guitar (9, 12), electric guitar (1), anvil (2), spring muffler (7)
Mike Ford - lead vocals (3, 8-9, 11, 13-14), backing vocals (1-2, 4-7, 10, 12, 15), woodblock (1), harmonica (2), guitar (3, 11, 13), güira (3), electric guitar (4), kabasa (4), money (4), flexatone (4), conga (6, 10), bass drum (12)
Dave Matheson - lead vocals (1, 5, 7, 10, 15), backing vocals (2-4, 6, 8-9, 11-14), guitar (1-2, 5, 7-9), accordion (2-4, 8, 11), bass guitar (12), electric guitar (13), scream (4)

Additional personnel
Doug McClement - "disfunctional youth" (4)

Production
Moxy Früvous - Production
Doug McClement - Associate producer and engineer
John Yates - Assistant Engineer
Andrew St. George - Assistant Engineer
Mike Stanutz - Assistant Engineer
Gabe Lee - Assistant Engineer
Scott Keenan - Assistant Engineer
Bob Ludwig - Mastering

Notes

References

External links
Official site with liner notes and lyrics

1993 debut albums
Moxy Früvous albums